The 1978–79 Polska Liga Hokejowa season was the 44th season of the Polska Liga Hokejowa, the top level of ice hockey in Poland. Eight teams participated in the league, and Podhale Nowy Targ won the championship.

First round

Final round

Qualification round

External links
 Season on hockeyarchives.info

Polska
Polska Hokej Liga seasons
Liga